Morela Airport  is an airport serving the Magdalena River town of Puerto Berrío in the Antioquia Department of Colombia.

See also

Transport in Colombia
List of airports in Colombia

References

External links
OpenStreetMap - Morela
OurAirports - Puerto Berrío
SkyVector - Puerto Berrío
Puerto Berrío Airport
HERE Maps - Puerto Berrio

Airports in Colombia